Dinosaur Train is a CGI-animated preschool musical television series aimed for preschoolers ages 3 to 6. Created by Craig Bartlett, who created Nickelodeon's Hey Arnold!, the series features a curious young Tyrannosaurus rex named Buddy who, together with his adopted Pteranodon family, takes the Dinosaur Train to explore his time period, and have adventures with a variety of dinosaurs. It is co-produced by The Jim Henson Company in association with the Infocomm Media Development Authority (formerly the Media Development Authority), Sparky Animation, FableVision, Snee-Oosh, Inc., Reel FX, and Sea to Sky Entertainment.  PBS Kids had ordered 11 more episodes, taking the total number of episodes to 100. A film based on the series from Universal Pictures and Universal 1440 Entertainment titled, Dinosaur Train: Adventure Island premiered on April 12, 2021.

Overview
The show is set in a whimsical prehistoric world of jungles, swamps, active volcanoes and oceans, all filled with dinosaur and other animal life, and connected by a train line known eponymously as the Dinosaur Train. This steam-engine train can be customized for dinosaurs of all kinds: windows accommodate the long-necked sauropods, there's plenty of headroom in the Observation Car for the larger theropods, and the Aquacar is an aquarium for sea-going passengers. The train itself is run by Troodons, as the smartest dinosaurs in this fictional universe. The Dinosaur Train circles the whole world—it even crosses the oceans and inland seas, with stops to visit undersea prehistoric animals. It can travel through the entire Mesozoic Era, the "Age of Dinosaurs", passing through magical Time Tunnels to the Triassic, Jurassic, and Cretaceous time periods.

The world of Dinosaur Train is seen through the eyes of Buddy the Tyrannosaurus. In the show's main title song, we learn that Buddy was adopted by Mr. and Mrs. Pteranodon. He hatched at the same time as his Pteranodon siblings Tiny, Shiny, and Don. By traveling in the Dinosaur Train around the Mesozoic, supplied with all dinosaur facts by the train's Troodon Conductor, Buddy learns that he is a Tyrannosaurus. As an adopted kid in a mixed-species family, Buddy is curious about the differences between species and vows to learn about all the dinosaurs he can by riding the Dinosaur Train. The dinosaur species featured in the show are actual dinosaurs discovered by paleontologists.

Dinosaur Train is co-produced and animated by Sparky Animation Studios in Singapore, with casting by Vidaspark and voice-overs recorded at Kozmic Sound in Vancouver, British Columbia, Canada. It premiered on Labor Day 2009 and airs daily on PBS Kids, and in various countries around the world. 40 half-hour episodes were ordered by PBS Kids for the 1st season. After that 49 additional episodes were made. Each episode is followed by a live-action segment featuring Dinosaur Train educational consultant and paleontologist Dr. Scott D. Sampson, who appears onscreen to explain the show's dinosaur curriculum in greater detail.

Episodes

Voice cast

Main
 Phillip Corlett as Buddy Pteranodon (seasons 1-2)
 Sean Thomas as Buddy Pteranodon (season 3)
 Dayton Wall as Buddy Pteranodon (season 4)
 Chance Hurstfield as Buddy Pteranodon (season 5)
 Claire Corlett as Tiny Pteranodon, Polly Polycotylus
 Ian James Corlett as Mr. Conductor, Adam Adocus, Alan Alamosaurus, Elliott Enantiornithine (in "Now with Feathers!"), Morris Stegosaurus, Mr. Argentinosaurus, Mr. Daspletosaurus, Mr. Elasmosaurus, Quentin Qianzhousaurus, Stuart Stygimoloch, Travis Troodon, Triceratops, Troodon Official, Vincent Velociraptor, Teddy Pterodaustro, Frankie Fruitafossor, Troodon Waiter
 Erika-Shaye Gair as Shiny Pteranodon, Annie Tyrannosaurus, Cory Corythosaurus
 Ellen Kennedy as Mrs. Pteranodon, Mrs. Einiosaurus, Mrs. Elasmosaurus, Grandma Pteranodon
 Alexander Matthew Marr as Don Pteranodon (seasons 1-2), Tank Triceratops
 Laura Marr as Don Pteranodon (seasons 3-5), Quincy Quetzalcoatlus
 Colin Murdock as Mr. Pteranodon, Announcer, Elliott Enantiornithine, Hank Ankylosaurus, Ralph Einiosaurus, Station Master, Stuart Styracosaurus, Ziggy Zhejiangopterus, Carson Carcharodontosaurus, Grandpa Pteranodon, Gary Goniopholis

Additional voices
 Mark Acheson as Marvin Mosasaurus
 Michael Adamthwaite as Jess Hesperornis, Reggie Raptorex
 Ashleigh Ball as Arnie Argentinosaurus, Crystal Cryolophosaurus, Gilbert Troodon, Lorraine Lambeosaurus, Maiasaura Mom, Millie Maiasaura, Mrs. Therizinosaurus, Oren Ornithomimus, Reba Rhabdodon, Gwendolyn Glyptops
 William Ainscough as Dennis Deinocheirus
 Kathleen Barr as Angela Avisaurus (in "T. Rex Migration"), Dolores Tyrannosaurus, Erma Eoraptor, Fanny Fabrosaurus, Jacqueline Jaxartosaurus, Laura Giganotosaurus, Mrs. Corythosaurus, Mrs. Ornithomimus, Ned Brachiosaurus, Ollie Ornithomimus, Pauline Proganochelys, Peggy Peteinosaurus, Trudy Triceratops, Tuck Triceratops, Velma Velociraptor, Velociraptor Mom, Remy Rhamphorhynchus, Effie Effigia, Paulette Polycotylus
 Craig Bartlett as Spider
 Adam Behr as Kenny Kentrosaurus
 Nicole Bouma as Soren Saurornitholestes
 Jason Bryden as Tommy Ptilodus
 Jim Byrnes as Percy Paramacellodus
 Natasha Calis as Leslie Lesothosaurus, Maisie Mosasaurus
 Adrienne Carter as Kiera Chirostenotes
 Garry Chalk as Marco Megaraptor
 Shannon Chan-Kent as Allie Alamosaurus
 Allison Cohen as Carla Cretoxyrhina
 Dylan Sloane Cowan as Rodney Raptorex
 Michelle Creber as Michelle Maiasaura
 Brenda Crichlow as Denise Diplodocus
 Deb Demille as Deanna Deinosuchus
 Trevor Devall as Boris Tyrannosaurus, Bucky Masiakasaurus, Mr. Deinonychus, Thurston Troodon, Peng Protopteryx
 Michael Dobson as Old Spinosaurus
 Brian Drummond as Alvin Allosaurus, Apollo Apatosaurus, Albert Albanerpeton, Eugene Euoplocephalus, Larry Lambeosaurus, Mr. Quetzalcoatlus, Mr. Therizinosaurus, Quinn Qantassaurus, Sammy the Slug, Ulysses Utahraptor, Zhuang Zigongosaurus, Trevor Triceratops
 Brynna Drummond as Daphne Daspletosaurus
 Mitchell Duffield as Mookie Maiasaura
 Alex Ferris as Paulie Pliosaurus
 Andrew Francis as Patrick Pachycephalosaurus
 Alberto Gishi as Mitch Michelinoceras
 Nico Gishi as Leroy Lambeosaurus, Max Michelinoceras
 Gordon Grice as Derek Deinonychus, Elmer Elasmosaurus
 Olivia Hamilton as Lily Lambeosaurus
 Phil Hayes as Chung Confuciusornis, King Cryolophosaurus
 Maryke Hendrikse as Penelope Protoceratops
 Ryan Hirakida as Dylan Dilophosaurus
 Alessandro Juliani as Martin Amargasaurus
 Diana Kaarina as Tricia Troodon (first voice)
 James Kirk as Perry Parasaurolophus, Rick Oryctodromeus, Nick Oryctodromeus
 Andrea Libman as Pamela Pachycephalosaurus
 Alan Marriott as Henry Hermit Crab, Herbie Hermit Crab, Iggy Iguanodon, Mayor Kosmoceratops, Deon Dimetrodon, Hap Haplocheirus
 Erin Mathews as Judy Jeholornis, Stacie Styracosaurus, Vera Velociraptor
 Donnie McNeil as Devlin Dilophosaurus
 Jason Michas as Henry Hermit Crab
 Bill Mondy as Jack Einiosaurus
 Peter New as Sydney Sinovenator
 Nicole Oliver as Brenda Brachiosaurus, Mrs. Pliosaurus
 Cedric Payne as Petey Peteinosaurus
 Adrian Petriw as Vlad Volaticotherium
 Joseph Purdy as Mr. Disclaimer
 Kelly Sheridan as Olivia Oviraptor
 Valin Shinyei as Sonny Sauroposeidon
 Rebecca Shoichet as Tricia Troodon (second voice), Kiera Chirostenotes, Cassie Castorocauda
 Tabitha St. Germain as Angela Avisaurus, Arlene Archaeopteryx, Cindy Cimolestes, Gabby Gallimimus, Keenan Chirostenotes, Computer Voice, Mikey Microraptor, Minnie Microraptor, Mom Archelon, Mrs. Conductor, Mrs. Deinonychus, Patricia Palaeobatrachus, Rita Raptorex, Sana Sanajeh, Selma Cimolestes, Shirley Stygimoloch, Sonja Styracosaurus, Spiky Stygimoloch, Stella Sea Star, Stephie Styracosaurus, Troodon Mom
 Chantal Strand as Valerie Velociraptor
 Lee Tockar as Crab, Craig Cretoxyrhina
 Kira Tozer as Ella Brachiosaurus
 Chiara Zanni as Shoshana Shonisaurus

Production

Development
In early 2008, after the successful first run of Hey Arnold! on Nickelodeon, Craig Bartlett decided to create another children series, this one set during the era of the dinosaurs, including the Triassic, Jurassic, and Cretaceous periods. Bartlett conceived the idea for the show, drew the main characters, and wrote a pilot script. Bartlett said he got the idea of the show after he saw one of his kids put a toy dinosaur in a toy train.

Episode segments
 Time for a Tiny Ditty – Tiny either tries singing about something she learned on the show or about her favorite dish (fish).
 Buddy has a Hypothesis – Children learn from Buddy and Tiny what a hypothesis means.
 Dr. Scott the Paleontologist – Scott Sampson is a paleontologist who appears on the show to teach children about the dinosaurs which have appeared in each episode, and how dinosaurs compare to present-day animals (including humans). He received his PhD in zoology from the University of Toronto in 1993 and,  is the CEO for Science World at TELUS World of Science in Vancouver, BC.

Songs
 "Theme Song" – The opening theme, which is about a mom named Mrs. Pteranodon and her children, including a T. Rex whose egg landed in her nest, revealed to be written by King in his debut episode.
 "Hungry Hungry Herbivore" – An adult Brachiosaurus (judging by his deep voice) shows up to sing a song about how herbivores love to eat green food.
 "I'm a T-Rex" – Buddy sings that he finally realizes that he is T-Rex, and sings about living in the Cretaceous forest.
 "Dinosaurs A-Z" – Mr. Conductor sings the Dinosaur Alphabet that his mother taught him.
 "Cryolophosaurus Crests" – King sings about his crest.
 "My Tiny Place" – Tiny sings about her "Tiny Place", which is actually her hideout in the form of a small hole in a tree. She sometimes shares it with Cindy Cimolestes.
 "Nice to Meet You (My Name is Tiny)" – Tiny's song she sings to Leslie to tell her how she can talk to other dinosaurs without getting scared.
 "All Aboard" – The original theme song before the official Dinosaur Train theme song.
 "Tiny Loves Fish" – Tiny sings a song about how she loves fish.
 "I Love Trains" – The Conductor sings about his love for trains.
 "I'll Always Be Your Mom" – Mrs. Pteranodon sings to her kids on how much she loves them.
 "Dinosaur Feet" – Daphne Daspletosaurus and the gang sings about their great big stomping dinosaur feet.
 "Sleep Little Dinosaur" – Buddy, Tiny, Shiny, Mrs. Pteranodon and Tank Triceratops sing Tank's lullaby that his mom sings to him every night.
 "I Learned a New Way to Improvise" – Shiny sings in a concert with Buddy, Tiny, Don, Cory Corythosaurus and Cory's cousin, Perry.
 "Ecosystem" – Mr. Conductor sings about living in an ecosystem.
 "Get into Nature Song" – Song about the Nature Trackers club and getting into nature.
 "That's Not a Dinosaur" – Tiny and the gang sings about how not every animal in the Mesozoic Era is or is not a dinosaur.
 "No Place Like Our Nest" – The Pteranodon family sings about how their nest is the only home for them.
 "The Biggest Dinosaurs" – Over several episodes the Pteranodon family go on trips to see the biggest sauropods, and this song is specific to those episodes.
 "The Prettiest Pteranodon" – Mr. Pteranodon sing it to his wife while on a date night.
 "Taking the Zepplin Home" – Mr. Conductor, Thurston, Mr. Pteranodon and Larry sing as they fly home to Pteranodon Terrace.
 "What's at the Center of the Earth?" – The Pteranodon Family, Mr. Conductor, and Gilbert sing about the center of the earth as they venture in it.
 "The Dinosaur Train Zeppelin" – The Pteranodon Family and Mr. Conductor sing as they travel in the zeppelin.
 "Laramidia (The Dinosaur Big City)" – All the dinosaurs get together and sing about Laramidia, also known as the Dinosaur Big City. In the first version, the Pteranodon Family and Mr. Conductor sing the song. In the second version, King Cryolophosaurus and Mayor Kosmoceratops sing the song.

Live show
A live show, "Jim Henson's Dinosaur Train Live: Buddy's Big Adventure", toured the United States and Canada from September 2013 to June 2014.

Home video
DVDs of the series from PBS Distribution were produced from 2010 to 2019. It also became part of PBS Kids compilation DVDs until 2021, when Elinor Wonders Why took over.

StudioCanal UK and StudioCanal Germany released the series on DVD in their respective countries.

Film
In July 2020, Craig Bartlett announced an 85-minute musical film based on the series on Instagram.

The film, titled Dinosaur Train: Adventure Island, premiered on April 12, 2021.

References

External links
 
 
 
 
 
 

2009 American television series debuts
2020 American television series endings
2000s American animated television series
2010s American animated television series
2020s American animated television series
2000s American children's television series
2010s American children's television series
2020s American children's television series
2000s preschool education television series
2010s preschool education television series
2020s preschool education television series
American children's animated adventure television series
American children's animated musical television series
American computer-animated television series
American preschool education television series
Animated preschool education television series
American television series with live action and animation
Animated television series about children
Animated television series about dinosaurs
Animated television series about families
Animated television series about siblings
English-language television shows
Fictional trains
PBS Kids shows
PBS original programming
Singaporean animated television series
Television series about rail transport
Television series by The Jim Henson Company
Television series created by Craig Bartlett
Trains in fiction
Television series about adoption